Man Wants to Live is a 1961 French film co-written and directed by Léonide Moguy. 

It was known as Les hommes veulent vivre.

Cast
Yves Massard
Jacqueline Huet
John Justin

External links

Man Wants to Live at Unifrance
Man Wants to Live at BFI
Les Hommes Veulent Vivre at BnF

1961 films
French drama films
1960s French-language films
Films directed by Léonide Moguy
1960s French films